Joseph Maria Bonnemain (born 26 July 1948) is a Swiss prelate of the Catholic Church who has been the bishop of Chur since 2021.

Life 
Joseph Bonnemain was born on 26 July 1948 in Barcelona, the son of a Swiss father and a Spanish mother. He speaks Catalan, Spanish, French, German and Italian. After completing school in 1967, he studied medicine at the University of Zurich, completing his studies in 1975.

While in Barcelona, he established a connection with Opus Dei. He studied philosophy and theology in Rome. On 15 August 1978 he was ordained a priest by Cardinal Franz König in Torreciudad and four years later incardinated into the personal prelature of Opus Dei. In 1980, he completed a doctorate in canon law at the University of Navarre. During this time, he also worked as a chaplain for workers and farmers in the Navarre region.

From 1981 he worked at the diocesan curia for the Diocese of Chur as a judicial lawyer and from 1982 as vice official. From 1983 to 1991 he was a member of the Delegation of the Holy See to the World Health Organization (WHO) in Geneva. In 1985, he was a chaplain at the Limmattal hospital in Schlieren in Zürich. In 1989 he was named an official of the Diocese of Chur. From 2002, he served as secretary for the Commission on Sexual Abuse in the Church established by the Swiss Bishops' Conference. In 2003, he was named a canon of the Chur cathedral chapter. In 2008 he was made a member of the Bishop's Council and in 2009 he was appointed a Chaplain of His Holiness. From 2011, he worked as episcopal vicar for canon law and for the cantons of the Diocese.

After the cathedral chapter rejected the three candidates Pope Francis proposed, he chose Bonnemain to be bishop of Chur on 15 February 2021. Despite his age, he agreed to serve for at least five years. He received his episcopal consecration on 19 March from Cardinal Kurt Koch. Bonnemain had women play all the roles allowed in the service. He said he will not have a coat of arms: "The sign of the Cross of Christ is enough for me. And this, only this, I will use."

In November 2022, he announced he would not fill the position of exorcist, saying "In most cases, people are simply suffering mental or psychological stress. They need support, prayers, a blessing or other appropriate services – but not necessarily a major exorcism." For years the Chur diocese attracted foreigners because it was one of the few in the region still performing exorcisms.

References

External links

Living people
1948 births
Bishops of Chur
Bishops appointed by Pope Francis
People from Barcelona
People from Surselva District
Spanish people of Swiss descent
Swiss people of Spanish descent
University of Zurich alumni
Opus Dei members
21st-century Roman Catholic bishops in Switzerland